Rage Hard: The Sonic Collection is a greatest hits album by Frankie Goes To Hollywood, released in 2001 by ZTT Records, exclusively to SACD. It is basically identical to the 2000 compilation album Maximum Joy, minus the second disc.

Background 

The track listing is a mixture of singles and album tracks. The band's seven singles are accounted for here, in their album versions. Also featured are the four cover versions the band committed to album.

Design and art direction were by Simon Griffin & Ed Sullivan at Dolphin Studio.

Track listing 

 "Relax" – 3:57
 "Two Tribes" – 3:22
 "Ferry Cross the Mersey" – 4:03
 "The World Is My Oyster" – 1:58
 "Welcome to the Pleasuredome" – 13:39
 "Maximum Joy" – 5:30
 "San Jose" – 3:09
 "Warriors of the Wasteland" – 5:00
 "Rage Hard" – 5:02
 "War" – 6:12
 "Watching the Wildlife" – 4:17
 "Born to Run" – 4:05
 "The Power of Love" – 5:30

External links 
 Rage Hard: A Sonic Collection at Amazon
Frankie Goes To Hollywood – Rage Hard – The Sonic Collection at Discogs

2004 greatest hits albums
Albums produced by Stephen Lipson
Albums produced by Trevor Horn
Frankie Goes to Hollywood albums